In parliamentary politics, balance of power is a situation in which one or more members of a parliamentary or similar chamber can by their uncommitted vote enable a party to attain and remain in minority government. The term may also be applied to the members who hold that position. The members holding the balance of power may guarantee their support for a government by either joining it in a coalition government or by an assurance that they will vote against any motion of no confidence in the government or will abstain in such a vote. In return for such a commitment, such members may demand legislative or policy commitments from the party they are to support. A person or party may also hold a balance of power in a chamber without any commitment to government, in which case both the government and opposition groupings may on occasion need to negotiate for that person's or party's support.

Australia

House of Representatives
In the 1940 federal election of the 74 seats in the House of Representatives, the United Australia/Country Coalition won 36 seats, the Labor Party won 32, the Non-Communist Labor Party won 4, and there were two independents, leaving the United Australia government of Robert Menzies without a majority in the lower house. The Coalition continued in government with the support of the two independents. The following year, the Non-Communist Labor Party, a breakaway Labor faction associated with former New South Wales premier Jack Lang, was readmitted to the Labor Party, and after the removal of Menzies by his own party, the independents in Parliament switched their support to Labor, allowing Opposition Leader John Curtin to form a minority government until his landslide reelection in 1943.

After the 2010 federal election of the 150 seats in the House of Representatives, both the Labor Party and the Liberal/National Coalition held 72 seats, and there was one Greens, one MP was a member of the National Party of Western Australia (which is not part of the Liberal/National Coalition), and four independents. After several weeks of negotiations, Labor Prime Minister Julia Gillard eventually retained power after signing separate confidence and supply agreements with the Greens and three of the independents. The agreements required the non-government party to support the government in a no-confidence motion and on supply bills, in return for the passage of some legislation, such as setting up an emissions trading scheme in the case of the Greens (see Gillard Government§Minority government). The Labor minority government was able to govern for the full term of the house.

Senate

The Senate, which serves as the nation's upper house and as a house of review, was established on the basis of ensuring that the smaller Colonies joining the Commonwealth were given equal representation, as required under the Commonwealth of Australia Constitution Act 1900. Between 1901 and 1918, Senators were elected on a first past the post system, changing to each state voting as one electorate on a preferential system from 1918 until 1948. During this period, the majority party in the lower house also generally had a commanding majority in the Senate. Since 1949, Senators are elected on the basis of achieving a transferable quota in each State or Territory. In more recent years, this method of election has generally resulted in a multi-party mix. In the early years after the establishment of the Commonwealth, Senators were more inclined to vote along State lines, with some exceptions.

The Senate has the power to reject, amend or defer bills passed by the lower house, thus obliging the government of the day to negotiate with minor parties in the Senate (or the opposition) in order to pass its legislation. The Australian Senate cannot directly bring down a government, though it can pass an indicative motion of no confidence and has the power to defer or block supply bills, as notoriously occurred in the constitutional crisis of 1975 which was precipitated, in part, by the deferment of supply through a manipulated balance of power.

Canada
Compared to other Westminster Systems, minority governments are far more common in Canada.  Much of this is credited to the relatively uneven electoral demographics of the country, with most national parties relying on regional bases.  Throughout the 1950s, 1960s, and 1970s, minority Parliaments were quite common in Canada, and produced many subsequent political compromises through political cooperation, mostly between the Liberal Party of Canada and the New Democratic Party of Canada, which included the Canada Pension Plan and Universal Healthcare during the tenure of Lester B. Pearson.  After the 1980 election, minority governments became less common in Canada for the next several decades, but the 2004 general election returned Canada to minority government, and the subsequent general elections of 2005–06 and 2008 would also result in minority governments, but the 2011 general election gave Stephen Harper's Conservatives a clear majority in the House of Commons for the first time since the merging of the Progressive Conservative Party and the Canadian Alliance.

Despite the frequency of minority governments, however, coalitions are rare to nonexistent in Canadian democracy, especially in federal politics, and especially in the modern era.  A notable exception was the political crisis that arose during the 2008–09 Canadian parliamentary dispute, in which the three opposition parties attempted to form a coalition government to oust the Conservative Party of Canada, which held a minority mandate in the House of Commons. This coalition failed, however, due to Governor-General Michaëlle Jean's resulting prorogation of Parliament until January 2009.

At the provincial level, by contrast, coalitions have governed in the provincial Parliaments of Saskatchewan, Manitoba, Ontario and British Columbia.

Sweden
With Sweden having proportional representation, small parties in the centre of politics often have vast influence over government formation, such as in the 2014 and 2018 election cycles, where the original coalitions could not form majorities in the Riksdag and bipartisan agreements were formed in bids to deny the Sweden Democrats the balance of power that was apparent by both election results. In 2018, the Social Democrats entered a pact with two centrist parties. This required the government to go against several key promises from the campaign regarding no tax cuts for high-income earners due to the coalition lacking a majority to stay otherwise. The Sweden Democrats voted for opposition budgets after both elections, leaving the leftist government to govern on right-leaning financial terms for the first halves of 2015 and 2019. Under the previous bloc-dominated politics, the balance of power was less flexible, with the smallest party of the governing bloc usually holding the balance of power courtesy of close elections.

United Kingdom
The normal UK response to a "hung" or "balanced" parliament is the formation of a minority government. Coalitions or even formal agreements by one party to support the government of another party are rare.

1847–1852 Conservative 325, Whig and Radical 292, Irish Repeal 36, Irish Confederate 2, Chartist 1. Total seats 656.

The 1847 United Kingdom general election produced a House of Commons in which no group had a clear majority. Candidates calling themselves Conservatives won the largest number of seats.  However, the split among the Conservatives between the majority of Protectionists, led by Lord Stanley, and the minority of free traders, known also as the Peelites, led by former prime minister Sir Robert Peel, left the Whigs, led by prime minister Lord John Russell, in a position to continue in government.

The Irish Repeal group won more seats than in the previous general election, while the Chartists' Feargus O'Connor gained the only seat the party would ever hold.

1885–1886 Liberal 319, Conservative 249, Irish Parliamentary Party 86, Others 16. Total seats 670.

As a result of the 1885 United Kingdom general election there was no single party with a majority in the House of Commons. The Irish Nationalists, led by Charles Stewart Parnell had the balance of power.

The Conservative minority government (led by the Marquess of Salisbury), which had come to office earlier in the year after the  Parnellites and dissident Liberals had defeated the Liberal government of W.E. Gladstone, improved its position in the election but not sufficiently to obtain a majority. During the general election Parnell had called on Irish voters in Britain to vote Tory (i.e. Conservative).

However, as Gladstone was willing to propose a measure of Home Rule for Ireland which Salisbury opposed, Parnell decided to bring down the Conservative ministry when the new parliament met. A Liberal minority government came into office in January 1886.

1892–1895 Conservative and Liberal Unionist 313, Liberal 272, Irish Nationalists 81, Others 4. Total seats 670.

The situation was similar to that in 1885–86. Following the 1892 United Kingdom general election, although the Irish Nationalists were split between pro and anti-Parnellite factions, they all still preferred the pro-Home-Rule Liberals to the anti-Home-Rule Unionists of Salisbury. The Conservative government was defeated early in the new parliament and Gladstone formed a new Liberal minority government.

1910–1915 January 1910 United Kingdom general election Liberal 274, Conservative and Liberal Unionist 272, Irish Nationalists 82, Labour 40, Other 2. Total seats 670.

December 1910 United Kingdom general election Liberal 272, Conservative and Liberal Unionist 271, Irish Nationalists 84, Labour 42, Other 1. Total seats 670.

The Liberal government of H.H. Asquith continued in office as a stable minority administration. Despite strains, both the Irish and Labour members preferred a Liberal government to a Conservative one. This continued to be the case until Asquith formed a Liberal-Conservative-Labour coalition to prosecute the First World War.

1923–1924 1923 United Kingdom general election Conservative 258, Labour 191, Liberal 158, Others 8. Total seats 615.

The 1923 general election led to the defeat of the Conservative government of Stanley Baldwin. The Labour Party of Ramsay MacDonald formed a minority government in January 1924. Although the party with the balance of power (Asquith's Liberals) appeared to be in a very strong position, the Labour leaders made a deliberate decision not to reach any agreement with the Liberals. As the Liberal Party did not want to join forces with the Conservatives and could not afford a quick general election, they were left in the awkward position of having to vote with the government on measures they had not been consulted about.

The Labour government eventually fell when, in a debate about alleged political interference in a decision whether to prosecute a Communist newspaper editor, the Conservative Party abandoned its own motion and voted for a Liberal one which thus passed and caused the resignation of the Labour government.

1929–1931 1929 United Kingdom general election Labour 287, Conservative 260, Liberal 59, Others 9. Total seats 615.

The situation was similar to 1923–1924. However the Labour Party was the largest party in the House of Commons, so the Liberals (now led by David Lloyd George) could abstain without bringing down the new Labour minority government.

As the world economic situation worsened, MacDonald had some discussions with Lloyd George. These led to a government bill to introduce the Australian style alternative vote electoral system. This measure was being obstructed by the Conservative Party and dissident Labour politicians and had not become law before the Labour government fell. A National government was formed, in 1931, with the support of a part of the Labour Party and Conservative and Liberal leaders.

February–October 1974 February 1974 United Kingdom general election Labour 301, Conservative 297, Liberal 14, Others 23. Total seats 635.

This election led to the Conservative government of Edward Heath losing its majority, with Harold Wilson's Labour Party winning four more seats. However no two parties (other than Conservative and Labour) could jointly provide a majority in the House of Commons. The balance of power was held jointly by the Liberals and others (Plaid Cymru and Scottish National Party, with the Northern Irish members)—who were unlikely to act together.

Heath entered into discussions with the Liberal leader Jeremy Thorpe. No agreement was reached, mostly because Heath was not prepared to agree to electoral reform.  Also, the Liberals were not keen to support a government which had just lost an election (although it did narrowly win the popular vote). In any event, a Conservative-Liberal coalition would have been a minority government and would have needed the support of the Ulster Unionist Party (which had recently broken with the Conservatives) to command a bare majority of seats.

Heath resigned and Wilson then formed a minority government.

2010–2015 2010 United Kingdom general election Conservative 306, Labour 258, Liberal Democrats 57, Others 29. Total seats 650.

This election led to David Cameron's Conservative Party being the largest party with no majority. The balance of power was held jointly by the Liberal Democrats and others (the Green Party, Plaid Cymru and Scottish National Party, with the Northern Irish members)—who were unlikely to act together.

Labour incumbent Gordon Brown and Cameron announced their intentions to enter discussions with the Lib Dem leader Nick Clegg, open to signing a deal to allow a government to be formed. Having stated before the election that the party with the largest number of seats should have the initial say on forming a government, Clegg announced his intention to begin talks with the Conservative Party. Talks between the Liberal Democrats and Labour were also held, but Brown's continued presence as Prime Minister was seen as a stumbling block to formulating a Labour-Liberal Democrat deal. Thus, Brown announced that he would step down as Labour leader by September 2010. With Labour attempting to form its own coalition government, the Conservatives promised the Liberal Democrats a referendum on changing the voting mechanism to the Alternative Vote (AV) system. In response Labour said that they would introduce AV then hold a referendum asking the public to approve it.

However, by 11 May, the possibility of a Lib-Lab deal was looking unlikely as talks between the Conservatives and Liberal Democrats continued, and after concluding that he would not be able to form a government, Gordon Brown announced his resignation on the evening of 11 May. Cameron became Prime Minister and announced his intention to form a coalition government, the first since the Second World War, with the Liberal Democrats. As one of his first moves, Cameron appointed Nick Clegg as Deputy Prime Minister. Later that day, the two parties jointly published the Conservative – Liberal Democrat Coalition Agreement specifying the terms of the coalition deal.

References

 British Electoral Facts 1832–1999, compiled and edited by Colin Rallings and Michael Thrasher (Ashgate 2000)
 Gladstone, by E.J. Feuchtwanger (Allen Lane 1975)
 History of the Liberal Party 1895–1970, by Roy Douglas (Sidgwick & Jackson 1971)

Political terminology
Westminster system
 Balance of power